This list includes Deobandi and pro-Deobandi organizations.

See also 
 List of Deobandi universities

References 

Deobandi-related lists
Deobandi organisations
Islamic organizations